Aric Vencint Williams (born March 21, 1982) is an American football coach and former defensive back who is currently defensive coordinator at Montana Tech. He was signed by the Philadelphia Eagles as an undrafted free agent in 2005. He played college football at Oregon State.

Williams was also a member of the Washington Redskins and Philadelphia Soul. He is the younger cousin of former NFL safety Shaun Williams.

In 2009, Williams was a graduate assistant at Northern Arizona University. After his playing career ended, Williams became a college football coach, beginning as cornerbacks coach at Montana from 2010 to 2014. From 2015 to 2017, Williams was cornerbacks coach at Idaho. Then from 2018 to 2021, Williams was cornerbacks coach at San Jose State. Starting in 2022, he has been defensive coordinator at Montana Tech.

References

External links
Arizona Rattlers bio
Oregon State bio

1982 births
Living people
Players of American football from Los Angeles
American football cornerbacks
Oregon State Beavers football players
Philadelphia Eagles players
Washington Redskins players
Philadelphia Soul players
Arizona Rattlers players
Cologne Centurions (NFL Europe) players
People from Diamond Bar, California
Northern Arizona University alumni
Northern Arizona Lumberjacks football coaches
Montana Grizzlies football coaches
Idaho Vandals football coaches
San Jose State Spartans football coaches
Montana Tech Orediggers football coaches